The 2017 Ontario Mine Rescue Provincial Competition was held June 6-9 at Compass Minerals Goderich Mine, in Goderich, Ontario.

List of competing teams

Kirkland Lake District

Kirkland Lake Gold North Complex (Holt McDermott & Taylor Mines)

Onaping District
Glencore - Sudbury Integrated Nickel Operations

Red Lake District
Goldcorp - Musselwhite Mine

Southern District

Canadian Gypsum Company - Hagersville Mine

Sudbury District

Vale - West Mines

Timmins District
Tahoe Canada, Timmins West & Bell Creek Mines

Thunder Bay Algoma District
North American Palladium Lac des Isles Mine

List of competing technicians

Awards

References

Mining in Ontario
Ontario Mine Rescue Provincial Competition
Mining rescues